The Wissenschaftliche Katholische Studentenverein (W.K.St.V.) Unitas Stolzenfels Bonn was established in 1910. It is a Catholic student fraternity at the University of Bonn in Germany. It is member of the Unitas-Verband (UV) an umbrella organisation of several Catholic fraternities and sororities. Unitas Stolzenfels is the second oldest of the four today existing Unitas associations in Bonn. Others are W.K.St.V. Unitas-Salia (1847), W.K.St.V. Unitas Rhenania (1912) and the sorority W.K.St.V. Unitas Clara-Schumann (1992).

History

1910–1938

Foundation: 1910 
Unitas Stolzenfels was founded in Bonn on November 28, 1910, as Unitas Sigfridia and was associated with the Unitas-Verband on June 6, 1911, by the  52. general assembly (Generalversammlung, GV) of the Unitas-Verband in Fulda. World War I prevented a fast buildup of the Aktivitas (the active student association). Only in winter term of 1919/20 the fraternity was re-established.

Colour-Crisis 
The colour-crisis was a struggle among the different fraternities of the Unitas-Verband. Some associations wanted to carry colours (hats and ribbons with the colours of the fraternity). Unitas Sigfridia was one of them. Therefore, it left the umbrella association in 1924 and founded with other fraternities the RKDB (Ring Katholischer Deutscher Burschenschaften (Ring of Catholic German fraternities)).

1st Re-establishment 
Together with 8 other members Hermann-Josef Stumpe, religion teacher, and Dr. Karl Loskant founded Unitas Stolzenfels in 1927, which didn't want to break away from Unitas umbrella association. The name refers to the castle Stolzenfels near Koblenz, Germany. With the other Unitas associations in Bonn Unitas Stolzenfels developed a viable confraternity. Before fraternities were banned by the national socialists, each of the associations in Bonn had 50 to 40 active members. The first house of Stolzenfels is still standing on Bonner Talweg. In 1938 Unitas Stolzenfels as the whole umbrella organisation Unitas was banned.

Post-war period

2nd Re-establishment 
After WWII Unitas Stolzenfels was re-established in the winter term of 1949/1950. A few out-of-town members and a few members of Unitas-Salia helped. Once again Hermann-Josef Stumpe, now pastor of the Bonn minster and bank director Dr. Karl Loskant were founding members. Official affiliation followed on August 4, 1950, during the 73rd general assembly (Generalversammlung, GV) in Munich.

In 1956 a new house had to be bought, since the old house was dispossessed by the national socialists, but was not given back after the war. The house and the parties held in this house will always remain a nice memory of the students of the 50s and 60s. In 1967 the house was sold to the Deutsche Bahn to finance a new house. This wasn't to good for fraternity life, since no festivities could be held in own rooms. It also wasn't possible to provide cheap housing for new students and members. In 1970 this changed at once with the opening of the new house on Hatschiergasse. There was more space for festivities and more rooms for students. The fraternity began to flourish once again. The house was inaugurated during the 95th GV in Bonn in 1972 by the nuncio in Germany, Archbishop Corrado Bafile.

Since 1963 an irregular magazine is published by Stolzenfels called "Convent".

Traditions

Principles and Motto 
 Virtus means you should always pursue a Christian way of life, which considers social engagement and willingness to fulfil our responsibility in church, nation and society.
 Scientia requests every member of Unitas, to deal with other academic subjects than one’s own. It is a possibility to enhance ones general knowledge and to sharpen ones judgement for a better world.
 Amicitia characterises our effort to win friends for life by friendly behaviour with each other and responsibility and concern for each other.

The motto of W.K.St.V. Unitas Stolzenfels is:
In necessariis unitas, in dubiis libertas, in omnibus caritas
In necessity unanimity, in doubt liberty, but above all charity

Flags and Colours 
The colours of Unitas Stolzenfels are the colours of the Unitas-Verband in the order of white blue gold 

The flag of Unitas Stolzenfels shows the colours white-blue-gold in horizontal stripes. Embroidered on them is the Monogram. On the other side the coat of arms is depicted on a blue basis. Underneath it reads: „Unitas Stolzenfels sei's panier“ (Flag of Unitas Stolzenfels)

Zirkel (Monogram) 

The Zirkel of Unitas Stolzenfels contains the following letters:

The exclamation mark shows, that this fraternity has active students. A Zirkel without exclamation mark still exists, but has no more active students and therefore has a high possibility of ceasing to exist when the last of the Alte Herren ("Old Gentlemen", members who finished studying) dies.

Coat of Arms and Needle 

In the Coat of Arms of the Unitas fraternities and sororities you will find most commonly four fields. These four fields usually show the following:
 A bundle of Arrows (the arrows represent Amicitia, the friendship in the fraternity meaning that the community is strong and cannot be broken like a single arrow)
 The Zirkel
 The Coat of Arms or the Flag of the Local City
 An Owl (Representing Scientia, meaning science and education. Sometimes sitting on a book or completely replaced by a book. The owl also sometimes sits on top of the Coat of Arms.)

Often you will also find two hands grabbing themselves to represent Amicitia.

As a sign of membership in every fraternity a needle is affixed to the collar of every new member at their official reception into the fraternity. The new member is now a "Fux". "Füxe" can look into the fraternity for one year and then decide to become lifelong members ("Burschen") or to leave the fraternity.

Known Members 
 Maximilian Goffart, auxiliary bishop in Aachen
 Josef Höchst, Member of the federal parliament in Germany
 Heinrich Krone, Federal minister in Germany
 Eduard Ackermann, Head of Department 5 of the German Chancellery during the Kohl-Era
 Joseph Goebbels, Reichspropagandaminister (Member from 1917 until 1919)

Literature

External links
 Internetsite of W.K.St.V. Unitas-Stolzenfels Bonn (German)
 Internetsite of the Unitas-Verband(German)

Sources 

 Unitas Handbuch Band I-V
 Fuxenfibel des Unitas-Verbandes

Christian student societies in Germany
University of Bonn
Student organizations established in 1910
1910 establishments in Germany